Olkhovka is a rural locality (a village) in Dyomsky Selsoviet, Bizhbulyaksky District, Bashkortostan, Russia. The population was 151 as of 2010. There are 3 streets.

Geography 
Olkhovka is located 33 km southeast of Bizhbulyak (the district's administrative centre) by road. Dyomsky is the nearest rural locality.

References 

Rural localities in Bizhbulyaksky District